SANDU v Minister of Defence may refer to either of two judgments by the Constitutional Court of South Africa:

 SANDU v Minister of Defence (1999)
 SANDU v Minister of Defence (2007)

See also 
 South African labour law